Homeobox protein Hox-C13 is a protein that in humans is encoded by the HOXC13 gene.

Function 

This gene belongs to the homeobox family of genes. The homeobox genes encode a highly conserved family of transcription factors that play an important role in morphogenesis in all multicellular organisms. Mammals possess four similar homeobox gene clusters, HOXA, HOXB, HOXC and HOXD, which are located on different chromosomes and consist of 9 to 11 genes arranged in tandem. This gene is one of several homeobox HOXC genes located in a cluster on chromosome 12. The product of this gene may play a role in the development of hair, nail, and filiform papilla.

See also 
 Homeobox

References

Further reading

External links 
 

Transcription factors